The Oradell Reservoir Dam, known as the Oradell Dam, is a dam in Oradell, New Jersey located at the southern tip of the Oradell Reservoir, connecting it to the Lower Hackensack River, which flows south to the Newark Bay. The dam is primarily used for flood control to dam the reservoir. Directly to the south is the Oradell Avenue road bridge that crosses the Hackensack River. The closest bridge northwards is the Old Hook Road (CR 502) bridge which is in the northern area of the reservoir.

References

Dams in New Jersey
Oradell, New Jersey